Lotte and the Lost Dragons is a 2019 Estonian-Latvian animated film directed by Janno Põldma and Heiki Ernits (who is also head animator), in a co-production between Joonis Films and Rija Films. It is the fourth film in the Lotte film series (third to be released theatrically), following the titular character.

Funded by the Estonian Film Institute with support from the Creative Europe MEDIA Programme, the film was completed for the 100th Anniversary of the Estonian Republic, and had its world premiere at the 69th Berlin International Film Festival on 6 February 2019. The film stars Evelin Pang as Lotte, with the voices of Helmi Tulev, Mait Malmsten, Elina Reinold and Sepo Seeman.

Synopsis 
Lotte gets a little sister named Roosi, and Karl the raccoon and Viktor the fish are scientists who come to Gadgetville, in order to take part in a big folk-song collecting competition. Whoever succeeds in recording the folk song of the world's oldest animal species, the mythical fire-breathing dragon, will win the competition's grand prize. Lotte and Roosi decide to help the scientists win the competition.

Release 
The film was released theatrically in Estonia on 2 January 2019, and had its world premiere at the 69th Berlin International Film Festival on 6 February 2019. It was a box office hit in Estonia, receiving 64,000 admissions amounting to a gross of €310,000 within its first month of release.

Accolades 
Lotte and the Lost Dragons was nominated for Best Animated Feature at the 2019 Shanghai International Film Festival.

References

External links 

2019 films
2019 animated films
Estonian animated films
Estonian-language films
Estonian children's films